The 1978 World Amateur Snooker Championship was the eighth edition of the world championship for amateurs, the first championship having been held in 1963. The 1978 tournament was played from 6 to 25 November.

Cliff Wilson of Wales defeated Joe Johnson of England 11–5 in the final to win the title. They had finished their first session level at 5–5, then Wilson won six consecutive . Johnson made the highest  of the tournament, 101. Wilson received £1,000 prize money as winner.

Qualifying groups
Group A

Group B

Group C

Knockout

References

Snooker amateur tournaments
International sports competitions hosted by Malta
1978 in snooker